S. Varadarajan, better known as T. V. Varadarajan, is an Indian theatre and television actor and news anchor from Tamil Nadu. He had been a news reader for Doordarshan for over 28 years.

Early life 
Varadarajan was working with Bank of India at their Zonal Office in Chennai, before he got an offer as a news reader for Indian's national television channel Doordarshan.

Career 
Varadarajan worked for over 28 years as a news anchor for Doordarshan emerging as one of its most familiar faces. Eventually, he got chances to act in plays by Y. Gee. Mahendra. In the 1990s, Varadarajan formed his own drama troupe. One of his plays Elavasa Enaippu won six awards from the Mylapore Academy.

Veteran Tamil film director K. Balachander gave him a chance to act in television serials. Since then, he has acted in leading roles in three of Balachander's television serials namely Premi, Kai Alavu Manasu and Kadhal Pagadai.

His recent play, 'Ithu Namma Naadu' was a resounding success. 'Ithu Namma Naadu' is a political satire that was enacted on 11 September 2013. This play was written by 'Tughlak' Sathya and Varadarajan directed and starred in it.

Plays

Filmography 
Films

Television

Awards and nominations 
2012: Nataka Kalasarathy - Won

References 

Tamil male television actors
Living people
Male actors from Chennai
Indian male television actors
20th-century Indian male actors
Year of birth missing (living people)